The Riigikogu (from Estonian riigi-, "of the state", and kogu, "assembly") is the unicameral parliament of Estonia. In addition to approving legislation, the Parliament appoints high officials, including the Prime Minister and Chief Justice of the Supreme Court, and elects (either alone or, if necessary, together with representatives of local government within a broader electoral college) the President. Among its other tasks, the Riigikogu also ratifies significant foreign treaties that impose military and proprietary obligations and bring about changes in law, as well as approves the budget presented by the government as law, and monitors the executive power.

History

History
April 23, 1919, the opening session of the Estonian Constituent Assembly is considered the founding date of the Parliament of Estonia. Established under the 1920 constitution, the Riigikogu had 100 members elected for a three-year term on the basis of proportional representation. Elections were fixed for the first Sunday in May of the third year of parliament. The first elections to the Riigikogu took place in 1920. From 1923 to 1932, there were four more elections to the Riigikogu. The elections were on a regional basis, without any threshold in the first two elections, but from 1926 a moderate threshold (2%) was used. The sessions of the Riigikogu take place in the Toompea Castle, where a new building in an unusual Expressionist style was erected in the former courtyard of the medieval castle in 1920–1922.

In 1933 amendments to the first Constitution was approved by referendum, where more power was given to an executive President. The following year, the President used these new powers to adjourn parliament and declared martial law to avert an alleged coup. In 1937, a second constitution was approved by referendum which saw the introduction of a two chambered legislature, the Chamber of Deputies (Riigivolikogu) and the National Council (Riiginõukogu). Elections were subsequently held in 1938 where only individual candidates were allowed to run.

During the subsequent periods of Soviet occupation (1940–41), German occupation (1941–44), and the second Soviet occupation (1944–1991) the Parliament was disbanded. The premises of the Riigikogu were used by the Supreme Soviet of the Estonian SSR during the second Soviet occupation.

Restitution of independence
In September 1992, a year after Estonia had regained its independence from the Soviet Union, elections to the Parliament took place on the basis of the third Constitution of Estonia adopted in a referendum in the summer of the same year. The 1992 constitution, which incorporates elements of the 1920 and 1938 Constitutions and explicitly asserts its continuity with the Estonian state as it existed between 1918 and 1940, sees the return of a unicameral parliament with 101 members. The most recent parliamentary elections were held on 5 March 2023. The main differences between the current system and a pure political representation, or proportional representation, system are the established 5% national threshold, and the use of a modified D'Hondt formula (the divisor is raised to the power 0.9). This modification makes for more disproportionality than does the usual form of the formula.

Latest election

Current seat allocation 

Reform Party 37
party leader: Kaja Kallas
Conservative People's Party of Estonia 17
party leader: Martin Helme
Centre Party 16
party leader: Jüri Ratas
Estonia 200 14
 party leader: Lauri Hussar
Social Democratic Party of Estonia 9
party leader: Lauri Läänemets
Isamaa 8
party leader: Helir-Valdor Seeder

Structure of former legislatures

Estonian Parliament 1992–1995

Estonian Parliament 1995–1999

Estonian Parliament 1999–2003

Estonian Parliament 2003–2007

Estonian Parliament 2007–2011

Estonian Parliament 2011–2015

Estonian Parliament 2015–2019

Estonian Parliament 2019–2023

Estonian Parliament 2023–present

Speakers of the Riigikogu
The salary of the speaker is €5,288 per month.

1921–1937

Speakers of the Riigivolikogu (lower chamber)

Speaker of the Riiginõukogu (upper chamber)

Chairman of the Supreme Council (1990–1992)

Speaker of the Supreme Council (1990–1992)

Since 1992

Chancellery

The Chancellery of the Riigikogu is the administration supporting the Riigikogu in the performance of its constitutional functions.

See also
List of members of the Parliament of Estonia
Chairman of the Supreme Soviet of the Estonian Soviet Socialist Republic

Citations and references

Cited sources

External links

Riigkogu's election law 

 
1919 establishments in Estonia
Government of Estonia
Estonia
Estonia
Estonia